Eid Dahiyat (born 1945) is a Jordanian politician, critic and academic.

Early life and education
Dahiyat was born in Shoubak, Ma'an Governorate, in 1945 where he first received his elementary education. This was followed with a secondary education in the then distinguished Ma'an Secondary School, finishing with honors as he graduated second of his class in Jordan and first among the southern governorates. Dahiyat then attended the University of Jordan, where he earned a BA in English literature, graduating first in the class of 1967. Dahiyat worked  as a teaching assistant in the Department of English Literature at the University of Jordan from 1968 to 1970, which was followed by a Fulbright scholarship to the University of North Carolina at Chapel Hill, earning his MA and PhD by 1973.

Academic career 
Dahiyat served in numerous academic positions in Jordan. He taught as a professor at the University of Jordan's English department, before being promoted to dean and later to vice president of the University of Jordan's academic affairs. This was followed by the positions of founding president of Al-Ahliyya Amman University and an eight-year role as the president of Mutah University from 1997 to 2005. Dahiyat also served as the Chairman of the Board of Trustees at Amman Arab University, Applied Science Private University and currently holds this position at Mutah University.

Dahiyat is a prominent Arabic academic in the field of Renaissance Literature and has written over 40 papers on the topic published in American and British Research journals, and is the author of 4 books in both Arabic and English. Dahiyat is also a member of numerous Jordanian and Arabic literary circles and associations, and is the recipient of a number of Jordanian literary awards.

Political career 

Eid Dahiyat was appointed Jordan's Minister of Youth in Prime Minister Zaid al-Rifai's Cabinet in 1986, and Jordan's Minister of Education in Prime Minister Taher al-Masri's Cabinet in 1991. More recently, he was appointed as minister of Education in Prime Minister Awn Shawkat Al-Khasawneh's Cabinet formed in 2011; a government given the task of "implementing a political reform process with clear milestones", also serving as the deputy prime minister.

References 

http://saltus.org.jo/supreme-organizing-committee/
https://web.archive.org/web/20111025041116/http://www.moe.gov.jo/NewsDetails.aspx?NewsID=1406

University of North Carolina at Chapel Hill alumni
1945 births
Living people
University of Jordan alumni
Academic staff of the University of Jordan
Academic staff of Al-Ahliyya Amman University
Academic staff of Mutah University
Academic staff of Amman Arab University
Government ministers of Jordan
Education ministers of Jordan
Sports ministers of Jordan
Academic staff of the Applied Science Private University